Muhammad Nazir may refer to:

 Muhammad Nazir (wrestler, born 1930), Pakistani heavyweight wrestler
 Muhammad Nazir (wrestler, born 1936), Pakistani featherweight and flyweight wrestler